Kolchak: The Night Stalker is an American television series that aired on ABC during the 1974–1975 season. The series followed wire service reporter Carl Kolchak (Darren McGavin) who investigates mysterious crimes with unlikely causes, particularly those involving the supernatural or science fiction, including fantastic creatures. The series was preceded by the two television movies, The Night Stalker (1972) and The Night Strangler (1973). Although the series lasted only a single season, it rapidly achieved cult status and has remained very popular in syndication.

Chris Carter cited Kolchak as a "tremendous influence" in creating his franchise The X-Files. In 2005, inspired by that success, The X-Files producer Frank Spotnitz resurrected the series as Night Stalker, with a new cast and characters, as well as subsequent novels and comic books. The new series was a ratings bomb, however, and was quietly cancelled after only six of the ten episodes which had been produced were aired.

Predecessors

Origins
The main character originated in an unpublished novel, The Kolchak Papers, written by Jeff Rice. In it, a Las Vegas newspaper reporter named Carl Kolchak tracks down and defeats a serial killer who turns out to be a vampire named Janos Skorzeny. The novel reveals that his birth name is "Karel", although he uses the anglicized version "Carl". After the success of the TV film and its sequel, the novel was published in 1973 by Pocket Books as a mass-market paperback original, entitled The Night Stalker, with a photo of Darren McGavin on the cover to tie it to the film.

The second television film, The Night Strangler, was also turned into a novel (written by Jeff Rice but based on a script by Richard Matheson), published in 1974 by Pocket Books.

Both novels were republished in 2007 by Moonstone in an omnibus edition called The Kolchak Papers. Moonstone Books has continued to produce Kolchak comic books.

The Night Stalker

ABC approached Rice with an offer to option The Kolchak Papers, which was adapted eventually by Richard Matheson into a television movie, The Night Stalker. It was produced by Dan Curtis and directed by John Llewellyn Moxey. Darren McGavin played the role of Carl. The cast also included Carol Lynley, Simon Oakland, Ralph Meeker, Claude Akins, Charles McGraw, Kent Smith, Stanley Adams, Elisha Cook Jr., Larry Linville, Jordan Rhodes, and Barry Atwater as the vampire Janos Skorzeny.

The Night Stalker first aired January 11, 1972, and garnered the highest ratings of any television movie at that time (33.2 rating — 54 share). Matheson received a 1973 Edgar Award from the Mystery Writers of America for Best TV Feature or Miniseries Teleplay.

The Night Strangler

Impressed by the success of the first television movie, ABC commissioned Richard Matheson to write a second movie, The Night Strangler (1973), which featured another serial killer in Seattle who strangled his victims and used their blood to keep himself alive for over a century. Kolchak recruits exotic dancer and psychology student Louise Harper (Jo Ann Pflug) to assist him in tracking down the eponymous strangler.

A fictitious version of Seattle Underground was used as a setting for much of the movie's action, and provided the killer with his hiding place. Dan Curtis both produced and directed the second movie, which also did well in the ratings. Rice wrote a novelization based on Matheson's screenplay. The novel was published in 1974 by Pocket Books as a mass-market paperback original under the title The Night Strangler with a close-up photo of the monster's eye to tie in with the movie.

Simon Oakland reprised his earlier role as Kolchak's editor, Tony Vincenzo. The cast also included Richard Anderson, Scott Brady, Wally Cox, Margaret Hamilton, John Carradine, Nina Wayne, and Al Lewis.

Several scenes were filmed with George Tobias playing a reporter who recalled a series of murders he had investigated during the 1930s. These scenes were cut before airing because of time constraints.

Production 

In late 1973, Matheson and William F. Nolan completed the script for an intended third television movie, to be titled The Night Killers, a story about android replicas. ABC decided that it wanted a weekly series instead.

After some negotiation, McGavin agreed to return as Kolchak and also served as the series' executive producer, though he was not credited as such. However, neither ABC nor Universal had obtained Jeff Rice's permission and he sued the studio. The suit was resolved shortly before the series aired in the fall 1974 season, replacing Toma on the network's Friday night schedule. Rice received an on-screen credit as series creator. The first four episodes aired under the title of The Night Stalker. After a month-long hiatus, the series was renamed and returned as Kolchak: The Night Stalker.

The later home video releases of the television series also used that title. The series theme had originally been part of the music score that Gil Mellé had composed for The Questor Tapes. While the show was set in Chicago and some generic location/background filming was done there in summer and early fall, the show was filmed primarily in Los Angeles and at Universal Studios.

The show featured a wide range of guest stars and many Hollywood veterans, including: Ken Lynch, Charles Aidman, Randy Boone, Scatman Crothers, Dick Van Patten, Jan Murray, Larry Storch, Jeanne Cooper, Alice Ghostley, Victor Jory, Murray Matheson, Julie Adams, John Dehner, Phil Silvers, Bernie Kopell, Marvin Miller, Carol Ann Susi, Jesse White, James Gregory, Hans Conried, Mary Wickes, Henry Jones, Carolyn Jones, Jackie Mason, Stella Stevens, Abraham Sofaer, David Doyle, Jim Backus, Kathleen Freeman, John Hoyt, Dwayne Hickman, Eric Braeden, Tom Skerritt, Erik Estrada, William Daniels, Jamie Farr, Lara Parker, Pat Harrington Jr., Larry Linville and Richard Kiel. Jimmy Hawkins appeared on the series as a Catholic priest on November 1, 1974, in what proved to be his last acting appearance. McGavin's wife and assistant, Kathie Browne, appeared in the final episode as Lt. Irene Lamont.

In addition, the series provided the first professional writing credit for Robert Zemeckis and his writing partner Bob Gale, who wrote the script for the episode "Chopper". David Chase, creator of The Sopranos, also worked on the series as a story editor, his first regular crew position in Hollywood. Though Chase is credited on eight episodes as story editor, he also helped rewrite the remaining 12. McGavin and others attribute much of the show's quirky humor to his creative input.

The show's ratings were mediocre and McGavin was growing dissatisfied, resulting in its cancellation after one year. The series aired on Friday nights at 10 p.m., a virtual graveyard for most TV series, particularly one aimed at a younger audience. In January 1975, the show was moved to Friday nights at 8 p.m., where it remained until June 1975. In August 1975, ABC moved Kolchak to Saturday nights at 8 p.m for four final weeks of reruns. McGavin found himself rewriting scripts and doing much of the work of a producer, but without getting either the full credit or the full compensation of one. McGavin had been unhappy with what he felt was the show's "monster of the week" direction, and an exhausting filming schedule. He asked to be released from his contract with two episodes remaining to be filmed, which the network granted in light of the show's dwindling ratings.

Two television movies, The Demon and the Mummy and Crackle of Death, were cobbled together in 1976. Each contains new footage as well as previously screened episodes from the series. McGavin provided a voice-over for both, which allowed the narrative to maintain some continuity.

The Kolchak series completely vanished after ABC's final repeat, which was the premiere episode "The Ripper", broadcast early September 1975. On May 25, 1979, The CBS Late Movie resurrected Kolchak with the fourth installment "The Vampire". The return of Kolchak proved a smash success. CBS pulled the series during midsummer and saved it for the fall premiere where it was expected to bring in more viewers. Universal held back four episodes to make two television movies. So successful was Kolchak on CBS late night, it was brought back two more times in 1981 and 1987-1988. After 1990, Universal pulled the two episodic "TV movies" and finally released the missing four episodes that CBS was not allowed to air. All 20 episodes of Kolchak were seen for the first time since 1975 in their original format on the Sci Fi channel in the early 1990s. They soon followed on Columbia House home video and later on DVD in 2005.

Besides Amazon carrying the DVD set for sale on its website, Netflix would offer it for rental and, by 2013, for on-demand streaming. During the early 2010s, Netflix would have it available to stream for a time, then take it off again. Kolchak: The Night Stalker would return for a last time in August 2016, just as Universal was about to release it again on DVD, this time digitally remastered. It was then dropped from the streaming site by 2017. Although the series was not added as part of NBC's new Peacock streaming site in 2020, it was available on the free ad-supported NBC.com. In September, it was added to the MeTV lineup at 11 p.m. Central on Saturdays, along with lots of trivia on its website.

On October 12, 2021, Kino Lorber released the series on Blu-ray using new 2K scans of the interpositives. The release featured commentary tracks by film/tv historians on every episode as well as the original previews for each episode.

Characters
The series features Kolchak as a reporter for the Chicago branch of the Independent News Service (INS), a small wire service.

INS characters
Carl Kolchak (Darren McGavin) Kolchak is a talented but outspoken investigative reporter with an affinity for bizarre and supernatural occurrences, obtaining information driving around Chicago in his yellow Ford Mustang convertible and snatching exclusives armed with his compact Rollei 16 camera and portable cassette recorder. Using only limited information, Kolchak has cracked several cases relying on gut instinct and often prevailing through sheer dumb luck. Often Kolchak's prospects are hampered by incompetent law enforcement personnel, and the destruction of evidence which prove his claims which advance the sheer implausibility of his stories where his peers, particularly his editor, are concerned. On other occasions his investigations have led to demotion or relocation of varying authority figures, though reasons for these actions are never fully disclosed.
Tony Vincenzo (Simon Oakland) — Kolchak's bellicose and frustrated editor, and one of the only people willing to tolerate Kolchak's antics, despite their frequent arguments. Vincenzo has a grudging respect for Kolchak's reporting skills, but often finds himself caught between Kolchak's zeal and his own management responsibilities. Vincenzo's hot temper often affects his blood pressure and digestion and he sometimes laments that he did not go into his family's Venetian blinds business.
Ron Updyke (Jack Grinnage) (18 episodes) — Kolchak's supercilious rival at INS whom Kolchak repeatedly refers to as "Uptight". A San Francisco native, Updyke is the opposite of Kolchak, always smartly dressed and hobnobbing with Chicago's elite.
Emily Cowles (Ruth McDevitt) (12 episodes) — An elderly puzzles and advice columnist known as "Miss Emily". Cowles aspires to be a novelist and expresses passion for issues relating to the elderly. She is often sympathetic toward Kolchak and the two share a warm working relationship.
Monique Marmelstein (Carol Ann Susi) (3 episodes) — A graduate of the Columbia School of Journalism and an intern whose Uncle Abe is highly placed in INS management. Despite her education and enthusiasm, many of her coworkers believe she got her job due to nepotism, an allegation she denies.

Other recurring characters
Gordon "Gordy The Ghoul" Spangler (John Fiedler) (3 episodes) — a city morgue attendant and sometimes source of information for Kolchak. He runs a lottery pool based on death statistics and other factors.
Captain "Mad Dog" Siska (Keenan Wynn) (2 episodes) — a Chicago police officer whose efforts to rein in his volatile temper were constantly thwarted by Kolchak's abrasiveness.

Monsters
The series managed in its short run to tackle most of the major monster myths, including classics such as vampires, werewolves, mummies and zombies. It also included stories about a doppelgänger, witches, a succubus and a pact with Satan. Four episodes focused on monsters and spirits based in native folklore, with two involving Native American legends, one Hindu and one Creole.

The series also dealt with creatures from science fiction, including a killer android, an invisible extraterrestrial, a prehistoric ape-man spawned from thawed cell samples, and a lizard-creature protecting its eggs.

The series also featured some more esoteric antagonists, including a headless motorcycle rider that hinted at the Headless Horseman myth and an animated knight's suit of armor possessed by a spirit. A story about Jack the Ripper was one of the few based on an actual historical figure, though the series provided a supernatural explanation. An episode about Helen of Troy (Cathy Lee Crosby appeared in the role) dealt with immortality and aging.

Music
Robert (Bob) Cobert scored the music for the original television movies. Gil Mellé wrote the music for the TV series, beginning with the theme that begins with Kolchak whistling in the opening credits. Mellé was hired and the theme was written in 20 minutes, just before the opening credits were shot.

Mellé left the series after the fourth episode, saying it was becoming too light-hearted. Composer Jerry Fielding took over scoring music for the remaining series, augmented by one score each from Greig McRitchie (best known for his collaborations with Fielding, and James Horner), and Luchi De Jesus. Music supervisor Hal Mooney reused much of Mellé's score in various later episodes (most notably The Spanish Moss Murders, which has no credited score composer) along with material from the other composers.

Two soundtrack albums have been produced. One released in 2000 by Varèse Sarabande features two suites of Cobert's music from the TV movies. The other, a bootleg copy of Melle's private tapes, features his theme and scores written for the first three episodes ("The Ripper", "They Have Been, They Are, They Will Be..." and "The Vampire"), and two cues from the TV movie The Questor Tapes.

The Mellé theme also appears on the TVT Records' Television's Greatest Hits Volume 5. However, all licensed soundtrack recordings of the theme use an otherwise rare original recording alternate take of the theme. Initially identifiable by the altered opening whistle, an off-key electronic note is seemingly randomly introduced towards the end, but when synchronized with the picture it corresponds to a specific visual. Mellé was known for his innovative use of electronic orchestration (which was used throughout the series); however, the producers chose not to include this stylistic element in his main title for broadcast, instead opting for a more conventional all-orchestral sound.

Episodes

Unproduced scripts
The series was cancelled with only 20 episodes completed but the initial order of 26 meant there were scripts that were completed but unproduced for the series. Three additional scripts commissioned before the series was cancelled still survive.

"Eve of Terror", written by Stephen Lord
The story is summed up by one of Kolchak's lines in the episode: "What if I told you that a deranged feminist murdered a Casanova lab technician, a sex goddess, and her purveyor?"

"The Get of Belial", written by Donn Mullally
Kolchak is assigned to cover a miners' strike in the mountains of West Virginia. He uncovers gruesome murders associated with a backwoods family and Kolchak suspects that they have some sort of inbred monster living with them.

"The Executioners", written by Max Hodge
Kolchak is demoted, and is given the choice of writing obituaries or writing articles for the arts section. He chooses the latter, and discovers a painting tied into a series of murders that Vincenzo is covering. These murders occur in a series of three, in which the first victim is hanged, the second executed with an ax, and the third poisoned. Working with an art expert, Kolchak attempts to unravel who or what is behind these bizarre murders and what they have to do with the painting, without alerting Vincenzo that he is working on the same story.

Legacy
Though Kolchak was short-lived as a series, its impact on popular culture has been 
substantial. In particular the series has been described as a predecessor to The X-Files (1993–2002, 2016, 2018). The X-Files creator, Chris Carter, has acknowledged that the show had influenced him greatly in his own work. In one interview when mentioned that the majority of the viewing public considered the success of The X-Files series as being inspired by other such past shows such as The Twilight Zone or The Outer Limits, Carter mentions that while those shows were indeed an influence on The X-Files, it was only about 10 percent, with another 30 percent coming from the Kolchak series and the rest derived as being based upon original 'pure inspiration'. Carter paid tribute to Kolchak in a number of ways in the 
show. A character named "Richard Matheson", named for the screenwriter of the first two pilot films, appeared in several episodes. Carter also wanted McGavin to appear as Kolchak in one or more episodes of The X-Files, but McGavin was unwilling to reprise the character for the show. He then pitched the idea of him portraying Mulder's father which he also turned down. He did eventually appear in several episodes as Arthur Dales, a retired FBI agent described as the "father of the X-Files". In the third episode of the 2016 revival series, a character prominently featured in the episode "Mulder and Scully Meet the Were-Monster" is conspicuously attired in Kolchak's trademark seersucker jacket, black knit tie, and straw hat.

Jim Knipfel in "The Omen: The Pedigree of a Horror Classic" on Den of Geek, opines of the 1976 film The Omen, "[T]here is no single source quite as central and clearly influential as 'The Devil’s Platform,' an episode from the first season of Kolchak: The Night Stalker, which aired in 1974[, and] stars Tom Skerrit[t] as Robert Palmer, a young politician whose meteoric rise seemed to come out of nowhere. He seems a shoo-in to become the new state senator from Illinois, but is already gunning for the White House. ...Palmer is rising quickly in the world of politics, which of course was the subtext of the entire Omen franchise. Anyone who threatens his rise or stands in his way—major political donors, speechwriters for the opposing candidate, even the opposing candidate himself—ends up dying mysteriously as the result of a tragic and freakish accident, which was the hook that brought most people to the theaters to see the Omen films in the first place. ...Palmer, again like Damien, also has a very protective Rottweiler familiar, who is impervious to harm. ...Like David Warner’s photographer in the first film, inexplicable photographic anomalies help point Kolchak in the right direction. ...And finally, in the end the ambitious Satanic candidate is dispatched with a holy instrument (blessed daggers in The Final Conflict, holy water in The Night Stalker). So there. In a way, watching 'The Devil’s Platform' is a bit like watching all three Omen films from an outsider journalist’s perspective, except Kolchak is able to wrap the whole thing up neatly in an hour."

Gary Gygax has cited an episode of the series ("Horror in the Heights") as part of the inspiration behind the Rakshasa in the Dungeons & Dragons game.

Peter Enfantino and John Scoler, on their Kolchak blog "It Couldn't Happen Here", note of episode 13, "Primal Scream", that "the script ... predates Jurassic Park in the 'recreated prehistoric life' sweepstakes."

2005 television series

Although Rice retains the rights to written Kolchak works, and Universal Studios owns the rights to the TV series, ABC maintained dramatic rights to the character and ownership of the two TV movies. The network began airing a new Night Stalker series on September 29, 2005, with the character Carl Kolchak portrayed by Stuart Townsend. On November 14, 2005, ABC and creator Frank Spotnitz announced that the new series was being cancelled due to low ratings. The complete 2005 series is available on DVD.

In a nod to the original series, the pilot episode has a brief shot from the original TV series of Darren McGavin in the INS newsroom, as the new Kolchak (Townsend) is walking through it. Inserted digitally, McGavin is dressed in the same frumpy clothes he wore as Kolchak in the original series and smiles knowingly while touching his hat. The satchel in which Kolchak carried wooden stakes and a cross to battle Skorzeny is shown. In another shot, when fellow reporter Perri Reed (Gabrielle Union) is searching through Kolchak's room, the hat McGavin wore in the original series is seen hanging on a coat rack. Other character names from the TV movies are referenced in various episodes, and one episode ("Timeless") recycled much of the plot of the TV movie The Night Strangler. In the 1970s, the Kolchak character was often seen in his yellow 1966 Ford Mustang convertible, while the new series' Kolchak drives an orange Mustang from 2005.

Other projects
In 1991, author Mark Dawidziak wrote Night Stalking: A 20th Anniversary Kolchak Companion detailing the production of the movies and TV series. In 1994, Dawidziak worked with Rice to produce the first official "Kolchak" material since the end of the TV series. The novel, Grave Secrets, moved Kolchak from Chicago to Los Angeles where he obtained a job at the Hollywood Dispatch newspaper (nicknamed the "Disgrace"). Most of the recurring characters from the TV movies and series also appear. Kolchak investigates a ghost who is killing those responsible for the destruction of the cemetery where its body is buried. An expanded and updated version of Dawidziak's Night Stalking was published in 1997 by Pomegranate Press as The Night Stalker Companion: A 30th Anniversary Tribute. In 2003, the scripts for The Night Stalker, The Night Strangler and the unfilmed The Night Killers were published by Gauntlet Press as Richard Matheson's Kolchak Scripts (edited with introductions by Dawidziak).

A comic book based on the property was published in 2003 by Moonstone Books, with some commercial success. Moonstone continues to publish both a bimonthly serial magazine and a series of prose novels and graphic novels featuring the characters. Moonstone also adapted Rice's original The Night Stalker script as well as two unfilmed scripts for the TV series: "The Get of Belial" and "Eve of Terror".

In 2006, Moonstone published a short fiction anthology, The Night Stalker Chronicles, with short stories contributed by writers such as Peter David, Mike W. Barr, Stuart M. Kaminsky, Richard Dean Starr, C. J. Henderson, Dawidziak and Max Allan Collins. A second volume, Kolchak: The Night Stalker Casebook, was published in January 2007 featuring new short fiction by authors including P. N. Elrod, Christopher Golden, Richard Dean Starr, Dawidziak and Elaine Bergstrom. Between 2007 and 2012, Moonstone published several Night Stalker novels and novellas, including The Lovecraftian Horror, The Lovecraftian Damnation, The Lovecraftian Gambit, A Black and Evil Truth and The Lost World, all by C. J. Henderson. A Black and Evil Truth was later released as an audiobook. In 2017, Moonstone published Kolchak: Double Feature: Nightkillers, which included a prose adaptation of Richard Matheson's unproduced script for the third tv film, now adapted by Chuck Miller for the prose format.

In 2022, Moonstone published a graphic novel called Kolchak: The Night Stalker - 50th Anniversary, which was edited by James Aquilone and nominated for the Bram Stoker Award for Best Graphic Novel. The book included stories by such writers as Rodney Barnes, Kim Newman, Nancy A. Collins, Jonathan Maberry, Steve Niles, Gabriel Hardman, and Peter David. Artists included J.K. Woodward, Marco Finnegan, Colton Worley, Paul McCaffrey and Julius Ohta.

Film adaptation
In May 2012, Disney announced a film adaptation was in the works with Johnny Depp starring and producing with Edgar Wright directing.

In other media
In the episode "Fearful Symmetry" of the cartoon series Justice League Unlimited, a reporter whom the Question is trailing talks to another reporter, Jerry, who is being curious about his colleague's sources. Jerry wears the trademark straw hat and coat of Kolchak and is designed to be a homage to him.

HPI: The Night Stalker - What Would Kolchak Do? is a paranormal-themed book dedicated to the TV series.

Home media
Magnetic Video released the first TV movie on VHS, The Night Stalker, and years after the label was taken over by 20th Century Fox, it was kept in print as part of its "Selections" series until their licensing deal with ABC expired.. MGM Home Video released the two TV movies on DVD on August 24, 2004. Universal Studios released Kolchak: The Night Stalker – The Complete Series on DVD a year later. Madman Entertainment released the complete series on DVD in Australia and New Zealand on July 15, 2009.

The two TV films, The Night Stalker and The Night Strangler, were each released on Blu-ray October 2, 2018, and DVD by Kino Lorber. Kolchak: The Night Stalker (1974–75) Complete Series Blu-ray (also by Kino Lorber) was subsequently released on October 12, 2021. The Blu-ray features 21 commentary tracks as well as a new interview with writer David Chase. In addition to recording a commentary for the premiere episode "The Ripper", Mark Dawidziak, author of The Night Stalker Companion and Kolchak Novel, Grave Secrets, also provided a Booklet Essay.

References

External links

1970s American horror television series
1970s American science fiction television series
1974 American television series debuts
1975 American television series endings
American Broadcasting Company original programming
Crime thriller television series
Edgar Award-winning works
English-language television shows
Fictional paranormal investigators
Fictional reporters
Occult detective fiction
Television series about journalism
Television series by Universal Television
Television shows adapted into comics
Television shows set in Chicago
The Night Stalker (franchise)
Vampires in television